Asolamendha Dam, is an earthfill dam on local river near Pathri(Saoli taluka), Chandrapur district in state of Maharashtra in India.

Specifications

Purpose
 Irrigation

See also
 Dams in Maharashtra
 List of reservoirs and dams in India

References

Dams in Chandrapur district
Dams completed in 1918
1918 establishments in India